Cariou is a surname, and may refer to:

The Breton etymology of Cariou (friend) is from Gallo-Roman name Carus and Carius (dear, darling).

Len Cariou (born 1939), Canadian actor.
Philippe Cariou, French actor.
Corentin Cariou (1898–1942), born in Loctudy, alderman of the 19th arrondissement of Paris, shot as a hostage during the occupation. An avenue in Paris and a subway station named after him in this district.
Corentin Cariou, born in Loctudy, French résistant died in deportation at Mittelbau-Dora, February 19, 1944.
Corentin Cariou, pseudonym of Yves Le Drézen (1899–1972) journalist.
Jacques Cariou, Eventing rider.
Warren Cariou writer and Associate Professor of English at the University of Manitoba.
Patrick Cariou, photographer, or Cariou v. Prince, a US Second Circuit copyright case about art
Eric Cariou, Lecturer in computer-science department in university of Pau

Breton-language surnames